Syzygium branderhorstii, commonly known as the Lockerbie satinash, is a small tree in the family Myrtaceae found in New Guinea and northern Queensland, Australia. It is cauliflorous, producing large inflorescences from the trunk. The fruits are eaten by brush turkeys (Alectura lathami).

Conservation
This species is listed by the Queensland Department of Environment and Science as least concern. , it has not been assessed by the IUCN.

Gallery

References

External links
 
 
 View a map of historical sightings of this species at the Australasian Virtual Herbarium
 View observations of this species on iNaturalist
 View images of this species on Flickriver

branderhorstii
Flora of New Guinea
Flora of Queensland
Taxa named by Carl Adolf Georg Lauterbach
Plants described in 1910
Trees of Australia